The class Heterotardigrada includes tardigrades (water bears) that have cephalic appendages and legs with four separate but similar digits or claws on each. 444 species have been described.

Anatomy 
The anatomy of the reproductive system is an important defining feature in distinguishing the different groups of tardigrades. Heterotardigrades have gonoducts that open to the outside through a preanal gonopore, rather than opening into the rectum as in the only other confirmed class of tardigrades, the Eutardigrada. The third class, Mesotardigrada, is represented by a single species known from a single specimen that is now lost, and the location from which that specimen was collected has since been destroyed by an earthquake, so its reproductive anatomy has not been studied recently.

Ecology 
Some orders of heterotardigrades are marine, others are terrestrial, but as for all tardigrades, all are aquatic in the sense that they must be surrounded by at least a film of moisture in order to be active – though they can survive in a dormant state if the habitat dries out.

References

External links 
 
 
 

 
Protostome classes
Taxa named by Ernst Marcus (zoologist)